Types of democracy refers to pluralism of governing structures such as governments (local through to global) and other constructs like workplaces, families, community associations, and so forth. Types of democracy can cluster around values. For example, some like direct democracy, electronic democracy, participatory democracy, real democracy, and deliberative democracy, strive to allow people to participate equally and directly in protest, discussion, decision-making, or other acts of politics. Different types of democracy - like representative democracy - strive for indirect participation as this procedural approach to collective 
self-governance is still widely considered the only means for the more or less stable democratic functioning of mass societies. Types of democracy can be found across time, space, and language. In the English language the noun "democracy" has been modified by 2,234 adjectives. These adjectival pairings, like atomic democracy or Zulu democracy, act as signal words that point not only to specific meanings of democracy but to groups, or families, of meaning as well.

Direct democracy
A direct democracy or pure democracy is a type of democracy where the people govern directly. It requires wide participation of citizens in politics. Athenian democracy or classical democracy refers to a direct democracy developed in ancient times in the Greek city-state of Athens.  A popular democracy is a type of direct democracy based on referendums and other devices of empowerment and concretization of popular will.

An industrial democracy is an arrangement which involves workers making decisions, sharing responsibility and authority in the workplace (see also workplace).

Representative democracies
A representative democracy is an indirect democracy where sovereignty is held by the people's representatives.

 A liberal democracy is a representative democracy with protection for individual liberty and property by rule of law.  
 An illiberal democracy has weak or no limits on the power of the elected representatives to rule as they please.

Types of representative democracy include:
 Electoral democracy – type of representative democracy based on election, on electoral vote, as modern occidental or liberal democracies. Also, electoral democracy can guaranteed to protect personal freedoms. 
 Dominant-party system – democratic party system where only one political party can realistically become the government, by itself or in a coalition government.
 Parliamentary democracy – democratic system of government where the executive branch of a parliamentary government is typically a cabinet, and headed by a prime minister who is considered the head of government.
 Westminster democracy – parliamentary system of government modeled after that of the United Kingdom system.
 Presidential democracy – democratic system of government where a head of government is also head of state and leads an executive branch that is separate from the legislative branch.
 Jacksonian democracy – a variant of presidential democracy popularized by U.S. President Andrew Jackson which promoted the strength of the executive branch and the Presidency at the expense of Congressional power.

A demarchy has people randomly selected from the citizenry through sortition to either act as general governmental representatives or to make decisions in specific areas of governance (defense, environment, etc.).

A non-partisan democracy is system of representative government or organization such that universal and periodic elections (by secret ballot) take place without reference to political parties.

An organic or authoritarian democracy is a democracy where the ruler holds a considerable amount of power, but their rule benefits the people.   The term was first used by supporters of Bonapartism.

Types based on location

A cellular democracy, developed by Georgist libertarian economist Fred E. Foldvary, uses a multi-level bottom-up structure based on either small neighborhood governmental districts or contractual communities.

A workplace democracy refers to the application of democracy to the workplace (see also  industrial democracy).

Types based on level of freedom
A liberal democracy is a representative democracy with protection for individual liberty and property by rule of law.  In contrast, a defensive democracy limits some rights and freedoms in order to protect the institutions of the democracy.

Types based on ethnic influence
 Ethnic democracy
 Ethnocracy
 Herrenvolk democracy

Religious democracies
A religious democracy is a form of government where the values of a particular religion have an effect on the laws and rules, often when most of the population is a member of the religion, such as:
 Christian democracy  
 Islamic democracy 
 Jewish and Democratic State
 Theodemocracy

Other types of democracy

Types of democracy include:
 Autocratic Democracy: where the party elected ruler will control unilaterally the state.
 Anticipatory democracy – relies on some degree of disciplined and usually market-informed anticipation of the future, to guide major decisions.
 Associationalism, or Associative Democracy – emphasis on freedom via voluntary and democratically self-governing associations.
 Adversialism, or Adversial Democracy – with an emphasis on freedom based on adversial relationships between individuals and groups as best expressed in democratic judicial systems.
 Bourgeois democracy – some Marxists, communists, socialists and anarchists refer to liberal democracy as bourgeois democracy, alleging that ultimately politicians fight only for the rights of the bourgeoisie.
 Consensus democracy – rule based on consensus rather than traditional majority rule.
 Constitutional democracy – governed by a constitution.
 Deliberative democracy – in which authentic deliberation, not only voting, is central to legitimate decision making. It adopts elements of both consensus decision-making and majority rule.
 Democratic centralism – an organizational method where members of a political party discuss and debate matters of policy and direction and after the decision is made by majority vote, all members are expected to follow that decision in public.
 Democratic dictatorship (also known as democratur) 
 Democratic republic – republic which has democracy through elected representatives
 Democratic socialism – form of socialism ideologically opposed to the Marxist–Leninist styles that have become synonymous with socialism; democratic socialists place an emphasis on decentralized governance in political democracy with social ownership of the means of production and social and economic institutions with workers' self-management.
 Economic democracy – theory of democracy involving people having access to subsistence, or equity in living standards.
 Grassroots democracy – emphasizes trust in small decentralized units at the municipal government level, possibly using urban secession to establish the formal legal authority to make decisions made at this local level binding.
 Guided democracy – a form of democratic government with increased autocracy where citizens exercise their political rights without meaningfully affecting the government's policies, motives, and goals. 
 Inclusive democracy – a left-libertarian formulation of democracy that includes democracy in the social, political, economic, and ecological spheres; primarily due to Greek philosopher Takis Fotopoulos.
 Interactive democracy – a proposed form of democracy utilising information technology to allow citizens to propose new policies, "second" proposals and vote on the resulting laws (that are refined by Parliament) in a referendum.
 Jeffersonian democracy – named after American statesman Thomas Jefferson, who believed in equality of political opportunity and opposed to privilege, aristocracy and corruption.
 Liquid democracy – a form of democratic control whereby voting power is vested in individual citizens who may self-select provisional delegates, rather than elected representatives.
 Market democracy – another name for democratic capitalism, an economic ideology based on a tripartite arrangement of a market-based economy based predominantly on economic incentives through free markets, a democratic polity and a liberal moral-cultural system which encourages pluralism.
 Multiparty democracy – an electoral democracy where the people have free and fair elections and can choose between multiple political parties, unlike dictatorships that have usually one party that dominates the other parties or it is the only legally allowed party to rule.
 New Democracy – Maoist concept based on Mao Zedong's "Bloc of Four Classes" theory in post-revolutionary China.
 Participatory democracy – involves more lay citizen participation in decision making and offers greater political representation than traditional representative democracy, e.g., wider control of proxies given to representatives by those who get directly involved and actually participate.
 People's democracy – multi-class rule in which the proletariat dominates.
 Radical democracy – type of democracy that focuses on the importance of nurturing and tolerating difference and dissent in decision-making processes.
 Revolutionary democracy – ideology of the Ethiopian People's Revolutionary Democratic Front
 Semi-direct democracy – representative democracy with instruments, elements, and/or features of direct democracy.   
 Sociocracy – a democratic system of governance based on consent decision making, circle organization, subsidiarity, and double-linked representation.

See also

 Global Foundation for Democracy and Development (GFDD) 
 Fundación Global Democracia y Desarrollo (FUNGLODE) 
 Communalism 
 Corsican Constitution 
 Democracy Index 
 Democracy promotion 
 Democracy Ranking 
 Democratic capitalism 
 Direct Action and Democracy Today 
 Education Index 
 The End of History and the Last Man 
 Four boxes of liberty 
 Holacracy
 International Centre for Democratic Transition 
 Islam and democracy 
 Isonomia 
 Jewish and Democratic State 
 Kleroterion 
 List of wars between democracies 
 Motion (democracy) 
 National Democratic Institute for International Affairs 
 United Front for Democracy Against Dictatorship 
 Netherlands Institute for Multiparty Democracy 
 Office for Democratic Institutions and Human Rights
 Penn, Schoen & Berland 
 Polity data series 
 Post-democracy 
 Potsdam Declaration 
 Public sphere 
 Ratification 
 Synoecism 
 Trustee model of representation 
 Vox populi 
 Why Democracy? 
 Workplace democracy
 World Bank's Inspection Panel
 World Forum for Democratization in Asia 
 World Youth Movement for Democracy 
 Constitutional economics 
 Cosmopolitan democracy 
 Community of Democracies 
 Democracy Index 
 Democracy promotion 
 Democratic Peace Theory 
 Democratization 
 Direct Action and Democracy Today 
 Empowered democracy 
 Foucault/Habermas debate 
 Freedom deficit 
 Liberal democracy 
 List of direct democracy parties 
 Majority rule 
 Media democracy 
 Netocracy 
 Poll 
 Panarchy 
 Polyarchy 
 Sociocracy 
 Sortition 
 Subversion 
 Rule According to Higher Law 
 Voting

Further types

 Absolute democracy 
 Bhutanese democracy 
 Consensus democracy 
 Guided democracy 
 Interest group democracy 
 Messianic democracy 
 Monitory democracy 
 Non-representative democracy 
 Procedural democracy 
 Sectarian democracy 
 Sovereign democracy 
 Substantive democracy 
 Third Wave Democracy

Bibliography
 Living Database of Democracy with Adjectives Gagnon, Jean-Paul. 2020. "Democracy with Adjectives Database, at 3539 entries". Latest entry April 8. Provided by the Foundation for the Philosophy of Democracy and the University of Canberra. Hosted by Cloudstor / Aarnet / Instaclustr.
 Appendix A: Types of Democracies M. Haas, Why Democracies Flounder and Fail, https://doi.org/10.1007/978-3-319-74070-6, June 2018

References